The 2004 Bass Pro Shops MBNA 500 was a NASCAR Nextel Cup Series stock car race held on October 31, 2004 at Atlanta Motor Speedway in Hampton, Georgia. Contested over 325 laps, the race was the 33rd of the 36-race 2004 NASCAR Nextel Cup Series season. Ryan Newman of Penske-Jasper Racing won the pole, while Jimmie Johnson of Hendrick Motorsports won the race. Roush Racing teammates Mark Martin and Carl Edwards finished second and third, respectively. 
This was also 2017 Cup Series Champion 
Martin Truex Jr.'s First Cup Series Start

Background

Atlanta Motor Speedway was formerly a  oval until 1997, when two doglegs were added and the track became 1.54 miles long and a quad-oval. As of the 2014 season, the track is considered one of 16 intermediate tracks on the Cup schedule.

One week after the plane crash prior to the Subway 500 that killed ten people, six of whom affiliated with Hendrick Motorsports, the four teams replaced their standard hood designs with a decal of the ten people killed.

Qualifying
59 cars were initially entered for the race, the most since the 1999 Daytona 500. After the preliminary list was released, J. J. Yeley, Greg Sacks, Larry Hollenback, and Andy Belmont entered the race, while Carl Long and Derrike Cope withdrew. Afterwards, Randy LaJoie replaced Larry Gunselman, and two days later, Cope replaced Stanton Barrett, and Mike Wallace replaced Jimmy Spencer. Brendan Gaughan went out for qualifying first, and Larry Foyt was the last driver to qualify.

Joe Nemechek started second, followed by Elliott Sadler, Carl Edwards, Greg Biffle, Dale Earnhardt Jr., Mark Martin, Jimmie Johnson, Kevin Harvick, and Jeff Gordon. Scott Riggs, Scott Wimmer, Kerry Earnhardt, Johnny Sauter, Hermie Sadler, Wallace, Cope, LaJoie, Sacks, Foyt, Kirk Shelmerdine, Morgan Shepherd, Belmont, Hollenback, and Kenny Wallace failed to qualify; Wallace never made an attempt due to a battery failure. Due in most part of Riggs and Wimmer—who made every race to that point—failing to qualify, it led to the creation of the "Top 35 Rule" in 2005 to ensure NASCAR's top-tier teams make the field.

Race
Prior to the race, a moment of silence was held for the ten killed in the Hendrick plane crash. Rock band Third Day performed the national anthem.

Joe Nemechek took the lead on lap one, though Ryan Newman led for the next 48 laps. Carl Edwards led for four laps before losing the lead to Newman during a caution period for oil on the track; Bobby Labonte was the beneficiary, allowing him to gain back a lap. From laps 54 to 74, Newman and Edwards led 10 and 11 laps, respectively, before Mark Martin led for 41 laps. Jimmie Johnson led briefly for four laps from 116 to 119, before Martin reclaimed the lead on lap 120; 18 laps later, Bobby Labonte spun in turn 2, bringing out the second caution, and allowing Casey Mears to regain a lap. Martin would lead until lap 178, when another oil caution was called, Greg Biffle the beneficiary, with Michael Waltrip leading lap 179, before Martin reclaimed the lead. Johnson and Nemechek led laps 237 and 238-239, respectively, until Martin led for another 70 laps; during Martin's lead, another oil caution was waved on lap 287 with Jeff Burton getting a lap back, and on lap 301, Kevin Harvick stalled on pit road; Biffle was once again the beneficiary. Johnson led for two laps until lap 312, when Dale Earnhardt Jr. crashed on the backstretch after Edwards made contact with him, allowing Kasey Kahne to lead for four laps. Brian Vickers was the beneficiary of the caution. On the final restart, Johnson took the lead from Jeff Burton, and led for the remainder of the race. With 9 laps to go, things started to get crazy behind Johnson. 6 cars with those being Jeff Burton, Michael Waltrip (whose 1 lap down), Carl Edwards, Mark Martin, Joe Nemechek, and Ryan Newman began to race hard behind Johnson. The 6 drivers came off of turn 4 going 3 by 3 down the front stretch. With 8 to go off of turn 2, Jeff Burton slid up the race track in front of Ryan Newman and somehow never wrecked. Johnson beat Martin by 0.293 seconds. The win was Johnson's 13th career Cup win, seventh of 2004, first at Atlanta, and third consecutive, making him the first driver to win three straight races since Hendrick teammate Jeff Gordon in 1998–1999, and the first to do so in a season since Gordon during the 1998 season. Martin finished second, and the top five consisted of Edwards, Nemechek, and Kahne; Burton, Vickers, Jamie McMurray, Tony Stewart, and Biffle rounded out the top ten.

Post-race

Over the radio, Johnson stated, "in loving memory, all the way," and celebrated his win by driving to the flagstand to receive the checkered flag, then performing a Polish victory lap; Johnson later stated he had felt guilty for destroying one of Hendrick Director of Engine Operations Randy Dorton's (who was among those killed on the flight) engines while celebrating his first career win.

In victory lane, Hendrick competition director Ken Howes gave Johnson a cell phone with Rick Hendrick on the line. The three other Hendrick drivers (Gordon, Labonte, Vickers) joined Johnson in victory lane, and the team wore their caps backwards in honor of Hendrick's son Ricky Hendrick.

After the race, Martin, who led a race-high 227 laps, defended crew chief Pat Tryson for their late pit stop strategy, stating, "We were a sitting duck. If we pitted, they stay out and win. If we stay out, they pit. So it was nobody's fault but those caution flags." Seven of the Chase for the Nextel Cup drivers suffered problems during the race: points leader Kurt Busch suffered an engine failure on lap 52, and finished 42nd; defending Cup champion Matt Kenseth also blew an engine, finishing 41st; Elliott Sadler crashed in pit road, damaging his steering, and finished 36th; Gordon finished 34th after being forced to go into the garage for a poor-handling car; Jeremy Mayfield's tire was cut, forcing him into the wall, and finished 26th; Ryan Newman suffered from pit stop errors, and finished 17th and two laps down; finally, Dale Earnhardt Jr.'s crash on the backstretch relegated him to 33rd.

Standings after the race

Source:

References

Bass Pro Shops MBNA 500
Bass Pro Shops MBNA 500
NASCAR races at Atlanta Motor Speedway